Sušak is a small village in the Municipality of Ilirska Bistrica in the Inner Carniola region of Slovenia, close to the border with Croatia.

Mass grave
Sušak is the site of a mass grave from the end of the Second World War. It contains the remains of German soldiers from the 97th Corps that were killed at the beginning of May 1945.

Church
The local church in the settlement is dedicated to John the Baptist and belongs to the Parish of Jelšane.

References

External links
Sušak on Geopedia

Populated places in the Municipality of Ilirska Bistrica